Ernst Kuzorra (16 October 1905 – 1 January 1990) was a German footballer of the pre-war era. During his entire career, he played for Schalke 04, whom he led to six national championships and one national cup. He is commonly regarded as the greatest Schalke player of all time alongside Fritz Szepan. A highly athletic, technical and prolific forward, Kuzorra is also commonly regarded as one of the greatest German forwards.

Life
Ernst Kuzorra was born as the son of Karl Kuzorra from East Prussia and his wife Bertha in the industrial town of Gelsenkirchen where his father worked as a coal miner. Ernst joined the club in 1920 at the age of 14, allegedly playing his first match in his confirmation shoes after being asked to join the team while watching from the sidelines. Three years later, he advanced to the first team, where he soon became one of the starting players. He was part of Germany's team at the 1928 Summer Olympics, but he did not play in any matches. During the years 1930–31, he and thirteen teammates were banned for a relatively minor infraction of the strict amateur statutes, having received ten instead of the allowed five Reichsmark as compensation for playing in an away game.

In the following years, Kuzorra along with his brother-in-law Fritz Szepan led Schalke to become the dominant team in German soccer, winning six national championships from 1934 to 1942. He was one of the main axes of what became known as the Schalker Kreisel, a system that used quick, short passes to confuse and overwhelm the opponent.

Even though he may have been the best German player on his position at the time, he only had 12 appearances for the national team, a fact that is widely attributed to bad relations with national coach Otto Nerz. Nevertheless, because of his success and his athletic prowess, national socialist propaganda soon took an interest in him. Great efforts were made to show that Kuzorra, despite his Slavic sounding name and mixed origin, was in fact of purely Germanic stock. The success of these efforts was limited, however, as Kuzorra remained politically uninterested and due to his taciturn character a poor instrument for public campaigns.

After the war, Kuzorra remained playing for a few years, mainly for material reasons - at the time, soccer players were often reimbursed in otherwise scarce foodstuff. In 1950 he retired, and from then on earned his livelihood as proprietor of a tobacco and lottery store. Over time, he became a living legend, especially among the supporters of Schalke 04. In 1985, he finally received the honorary citizenship of his home town, Gelsenkirchen. Ernst Kuzorra died on New Year's Day in 1990 at the age of 84. Including official games, friendlies and youth games, he reportedly scored over 1000 goals for Schalke.

Career statistics

Club

International

Honours 
Schalke 04
German Championship: 1934, 1935, 1937, 1939, 1940, 1942
German Cup: 1937

References

External links

 
 
 Article about early history of Schalke 04 

1905 births
1990 deaths
German footballers
Association football forwards
Germany international footballers
Olympic footballers of Germany
Footballers at the 1928 Summer Olympics
Sportspeople from Gelsenkirchen
People from the Province of Westphalia
FC Schalke 04 players
German football managers
Borussia Dortmund managers
FC Schalke 04 managers
Footballers from North Rhine-Westphalia